Pierre Corneille Faculys Basson (1880 — January 22, 1906) was a serial killer in Cape Colony. He killed and buried at least nine people in his backyard in Claremont, Cape Town, so he could later claim their life insurance payout. When police officers arrived at his house, he shot himself.

Life 
Basson was born in 1880 and was guilty of cruel acts at an early age. When he was 12, he sliced a boy with a knife and enjoyed watching animals suffer. Among other things, he enjoyed catching and killing birds. He also cut off cats' feet to see how they writhed from the pain.

As an adult, Basson lent money to people. Borrowers had to name him as beneficiary for their life insurance policies, after which he killed them between 13 February 1903, until 22 January 1906, to claim the money.

Basson's first victim was his brother Jasper, who drowned on a fishing trip on February 4, 1903. Jasper's body was never found and the insurance company initially did not want to pay the policy until they were ordered by a court to do so.

He took his own life when the police uncovered the grave of his last victim, Wilhelm Schaefer (a German farmer). His last words to his mother when the police started excavations in their yard were: "I'm going to go to the police. I did not do anything wrong."

He was posthumously convicted of murder after 1906.

See also
 List of serial killers by country

References 

1880 births
1906 suicides
Cape Colony people
Fratricides
Male serial killers
Murderers for life insurance money
South African serial killers